Conus gradatulus is a species of sea snail, a marine gastropod mollusk in the family Conidae, the cone snails and their allies.

Like all species within the genus Conus, these snails are predatory and venomous. They are capable of "stinging" humans, therefore live ones should be handled carefully or not at all.

Description
The size of the shell varies between 41 mm and 72 mm. The spire is elevated, gradate, with channeled whorls. The body whorl is roseate with three series of longitudinal maculations of chestnut-color, forming interrupted bands. The aperture is rosy.

Distribution
This marine species occurs off the Agulhas Bank, South Africa.

Gallery

References

 Sowerby, G.B. Jr. II (1870). Descriptions of Forty-eight new Species of Shells. Proc. Zool. Soc. Lond. (1870): 249–259 
 Puillandre N., Duda T.F., Meyer C., Olivera B.M. & Bouchet P. (2015). One, four or 100 genera? A new classification of the cone snails. Journal of Molluscan Studies. 81: 1–23

External links
 The Conus Biodiversity website
 Cone Shells – Knights of the Sea
 

gradatulus
Gastropods described in 1875